Thomas Armon Pridgen (born November 23, 1983) is an American drummer, best known for his role as the drummer of The Mars Volta from October 2006 until October 2009. He is touring with rapper Residente and is the drummer for hardcore punk band Trash Talk, as well as his own project The Memorials.

Biography
Pridgen won the Guitar Center Drum-Off at age nine, and at age ten was the youngest recipient for a Zildjian endorsement in the nearly 400-year history of the company. Pridgen is also naturally left-handed, but plays the drum kit as if he is a right-hander with his kit set-up right-handed. Pridgen has studied with David Garibaldi, Walfredo Reyes Sr., Troy Lucketta, and Curtis Nutall. He endorses DW Drums, Zildjian Cymbals, Evans Drumheads, Audix Microphones, and Zildjian Drumsticks (as of 2017). Pridgen was also the recipient of a four-year scholarship to Berklee College of Music in 1999 at the age of 15; he was the youngest musician to ever receive this scholarship. He has played in clinics with Walfredo Reyes Jr. and Dennis Chambers. By his teenage years he had already done studio sessions with many Bay Area Gospel artists.

Pridgen's first non-gospel touring experience was as the drummer for The Coup, who he worked with in 2001 and 2002.

In 2006, Pridgen received a call from Omar Rodríguez-López of The Mars Volta:

In 2007, Pridgen became the new permanent drummer for The Mars Volta. Pridgen's first appearance was at the March 12 show in New Zealand, where the band debuted the song "Idle Tooth" which was later renamed "Wax Simulacra" for the forthcoming album. After shows in New Zealand and Australia, The Mars Volta toured a few West Coast venues as the headliner, then entered the studio to record their fourth LP, The Bedlam in Goliath. Pridgen's style on Bedlam in Goliath used "blistering 32nd-note full-set combinations, stunning single-stroke rolls, and blazing single bass drum patterns" along with creative and precise paradiddle technique.

Pridgen has been voted as 'Best Up and Coming Drummer' by Modern Drummer magazine.

Besides his work with The Mars Volta, he has also been involved with Christian Scott and Wicked Wisdom. Pridgen, for some time, was working with singer Keyshia Cole as her live and session drummer and being her music director. He also was featured alongside Tony Royster Jr., Eric Moore, and others in drumming DVD entitled "Shed Sessions", a Gospel Chops DVD.

Pridgen was also featured on the Modern Drummer 2008 DVD with footage from his performance at the festival.

Departure from The Mars Volta (2009)
In October 2009, Pridgen left The Mars Volta. To this day, the band has made no official statement as to the reason for the departure. Dave Elitch subsequently filled in the drummer position for the remainder of the tour, who was then replaced by Deantoni Parks.

On October 14, 2013, Mars Volta bassist Juan Alderete said on the podcast Let There Be Talk, that "He's an amazing drummer, just not a mature dude. […] One night, he got super wasted, peed on the bus, started fighting with Cedric […]."

The Memorials (December 2009)
In December 2009, Pridgen formed another band called The Memorials with friends and former students from Berklee College of Music - Viveca Hawkins (vocals) and Nick Brewer (guitars).

The band's self-titled debut was released on January 18, 2011.

Elixir on Mute (2010)
By invitation of Elixir on Mute's headman Jordan Ferreira, Pridgen took part in the recording of the band's debut End of Sky (released September 1 2010).

November 10, 2011, the band had decided upon a name, Giraffe Tongue Orchestra. By then the supergroup was working on writing songs.

In January 2012, it was announced that fellow former The Mars Volta drummer Jon Theodore replaced Pridgen in Giraffe Tongue Orchestra, though by March 2015, Pridgen once again became the drummer of GTO.

The Memorials (Delirium), TEN (Eric McFadden), Vigilant (Jon Reshard), Thundercat (Stephen Bruner), Elixir On Mute (Jordan Ferreira), Wicked Evolution (Jada Pinkett Smith) (2012) 

The Memorials

Still working on his personal project The Memorials. His second album, Delirium, released on June 5, 2012. The track "Fluorescent's Unforgiving" was released via Soundcloud in November 2011.

TEN

Spring of 2012, teamed up with guitarist, Eric McFadden (P-Funk, The Animals, Stockholm Syndrome), and Fishbone bassist, Norwood Fisher. phYne Entertainment produced five tracks for the new trio in a San Francisco studio. The project is called, TEN, as there is talk of a tour in the fall.

Vigilant

Recording album with Jon Reshard, Chloe Pappas, Jordan Ferreira. Work to be released in 2012.

Thundercat

Guest live drummer in support of  Thundercat. Toured all over Europe in spring 2012.

Wicked Evolution

Took part in Wicked Evolution Jada Pinkett Smith's Live Recorded Sessions.

European tour with The Memorials

After completing 3 tours (Freedom Tour, Equinox Tour, Waterguns, B B Q, & Hot Chocolate Tour) over the United States with The Memorials, the band are preparing for a European tour to launch in October 2012.

Pinnick Gales Pridgen

On February 12, 2013, Magna Carta released the Mike Varney-produced "Pinnick Gales Pridgen", featuring Eric Gales on guitar and vocals, dUg Pinnick (of King's X) on bass and vocals, and Pridgen on drums. The 13-track album features one cover song, "Sunshine of Your Love", originally by Cream, one short instrumental based on Ludwig van Beethoven's "Für Elise", and the remaining songs written by some combination of Pinnick, Gales, Pridgen and Varney.

Suicidal Tendencies, Chiodos, Trash Talk (2014)
On March 11, 2014, Pridgen confirmed on his Instagram and Facebook page that he has joined Suicidal Tendencies. On September 3, Pridgen along with Joseph Troy have joined Chiodos after members Derrick Frost and Matt Goddard left the band. During this time period, Pridgen also recorded the drums for the album "No Peace", by Trash Talk, which was released April 22, 2014.

Giraffe Tongue Orchestra (2011, 2015–2017) 
In mid-2011, it was announced that Pridgen was working on a new group with Mastodon vocalist and guitarist Brent Hinds, the Dillinger Escape Plan guitarist Ben Weinman, and former Jane's Addiction bassist Eric Avery. Giraffe Tongue Orchestra was founded in 2012.

The band's debut album Broken Lines was released September 23, 2016 with the main line-up featuring Hinds, Pridgen and Weinman, who were joined by William DuVall from Alice in Chains and Pete Griffin from Dethklok.

Residente and rejoining Trash Talk (2017–present)
On March 31, 2017, rapper Residente released his debut solo album self-titled Residente. Pridgen was announced later as part of the touring members of the Residente band.

In May 2020, Pridgen announced he has rejoined Trash Talk to record their new EP, Squalor, which is due to be released June 6.

Equipment

With The Mars Volta

Bedlam Tour Kit (2007 - 2008) 
DW Collector's Series & Zildjian Cymbals:
Drums - Clear Acrylic
12x8" Tom
13x10" Tom
15x13" Floor Tom
16x14" Floor Tom
18x16" Floor Tom
24x20" Bass Drum
14x6.5" DW Copper Snare
Cymbals - Zildjian
18" [x2] A Crashes used as Hi-Hats
24" A Medium Ride
20" A Armand Ride
20" A Custom Crash
20" Oriental Crash Of Doom
18" A Custom EFX Crash, 9" Oriental Splash, 16" Oriental China (x2) (cymbals stacked)
19" K Custom Hybrid China

Octahedron Tour Kit (2009) 
DW Jazz Series & Zildjian Cymbals:
Drums - Maple & Gum
12x12" Tom
13x13" Tom
15x13" Floor Tom
16x14" Floor Tom
18x16" Floor Tom
24x20" Bass Drum
14x7 Red Maple Snare
Cymbals - Zildjian
18" A Crashes [x2] used as Hi-Hats
24" A Medium Ride
24" K Custom Ride [x2]
18" A Custom EFX Crash, 9" Oriental Splash, 16" Oriental China (x2) (cymbals stacked)
20" A Custom China
20" Crash of Doom

With The Memorials
DW Collector's Series & Zildjian Cymbals:
Drums - Clear Acrylic
12x7" Tom
13x8" Tom
16x14" Floor Tom
18x16" Floor Tom
24x16" Bass Drum
14x6.5" DW Stainless steel snare
Cymbals - Zildjian
19" [x2] Z3 Custom Crashes used as Hi-Hats
24" A Medium Ride
20" A Custom Crash
20" Z3 Crash
18" A Custom EFX Crash, 9" Oriental Splash, 16" Oriental China (x2) (cymbals stacked)
20" A Custom China
Wind Chimes
Drum Heads - Evans
Toms: (12", 13", 15", 16") Clear G2s (top), Clear Resonants (bottom)
Bass Drum: (24") Clear EQ3 (batter), Clear EQ3 (with small hole) (resonant)
Snares : (14") Clear G2 (top), 300 Hazy (bottom)
Thomas also used DW 9000 Series Hardware and Pedals, Pro-Mark TX510 Thomas Pridgen Autograph drumsticks, & Shure Microphones.
Thomas has recently been seen using a kit made from resin by a company based out of Ventura, CA Thump Drums.

Discography
For a more complete discography, see Thomas Pridgen's entry on Album Credits.

With Zenith Patrol
 VU (2005)

With Christian Scott
Rewind That (2006)

With Eric Gales
Crystal Vision - (2006)
Psychedelic Underground (Eric Gales album) - (2007)

With dUg Pinnick and Eric Gales
"Pinnick Gales Pridgen" - (2013)
"PGP 2" - (2014)

With The Mars Volta
 The Bedlam in Goliath (2008)
 Octahedron (2009)

With Omar Rodríguez-López
Calibration (Is Pushing Luck and Key Too Far) (2007) - "Mexico", "Sidewalk Fins", "Las Lagrimas de Arakuine"
Los Sueños de un Hígado (2009)
Xenophanes (2009)
Equinox (2013) - "Sueños Salvajes" & "Popolon"
¿Sólo Extraño? (2013) - "Common Condescend"
Nom de Guerre Cabal (2016) - "Nom de Guerre"
Some Need It Lonely (2016) - "Sanity a Dream", "Back to the Same", "Zero Worth"/"Barachiel Is At It Again"
Gorilla Preacher Cartel (2017) - "Lección en Ignoracia"
Solid State Mercenaries (2017) - "Five Star" & "Try On Little Man"

With Juliette Lewis
 Terra Incognita (2009)

With Elixir on Mute
End of Sky (2010)

With Foxy Shazam
Foxy Shazam (2010)

With Jada Pinkett Smith
Live Recording Sessions (2012)

With The Memorials
The Memorials (2011)
Delirium (2012)

With Trash Talk
"No Peace" (2014)
"Squalor" (2020)

With Spiritworld
Pagan Rhythms (2020)
DEATHWESTERN (2022)

References

External links

Thomas Pridgen's on Album Credits
Drum Channel | Thomas Pridgen

1983 births
Living people
People from Alameda County, California
African-American drummers
African-American rock musicians
Berkeley High School (Berkeley, California) alumni
Berklee College of Music alumni
Grammy Award winners
Progressive rock drummers
21st-century American drummers
21st-century African-American musicians
20th-century African-American people